French High School was a public high school in Jefferson County, Texas in operation from 1913 to 1986. At the time of closure it was operated by the Beaumont Independent School District, though it was initially operated by the French Independent School District.

Its namesake was John Jay French, a man who settled the Beaumont area. Its mascot was a buffalo, represented by Big Bills I and II. It was merged into Beaumont Central High School in 1986.

References

Beaumont Independent School District high schools
Public high schools in Texas